The Annual Review of Information Science and Technology was relaunched by the Association for Information Science and Technology's Board of Directors in 2021, following a 10-year publishing hiatus. Previously, this annual review journal was published from 1966 to 2011. It was established in 1965 by the American Documentation Institute and the National Science Foundation, at the request of Helen Brownson. It published review articles rather than empirical research articles. Its last (2010) impact factor was 2.000. It was for 45 years "the main forum for scholarly review articles in information science."

Publishers and editors
The current editor is Lisa M. Given, Professor of Information Sciences at RMIT University. The first editor-in-chief was Carlos A. Cuadra (System Development Corporation). From Vol. 11 (1976) - vol. 35 (2001) editor-in-chief was Martha E. Williams; from Vol. 36 (2002) to Volume 45 (2011) the editor was Blaise Cronin.
 
The first publisher was Encyclopædia Britannica, Inc.; since Vol. 26 (1991) it was published by Information Today, Inc. on behalf of American Society for Information Science and Technology.

References

Further reading 
 ASIST (2021), ARIST relaunches following 10-year hiatus
 ASIST (2010), ARIST to cease publication following 2011 volume
 Bawden, David (2010).  Alas poor ARIST: reviewing the information sciences. Journal of Documentation, 66(5), 625-626. 
 Cronin, B. (2010), “Advances in information science”, Journal of the American Society for Information Science and Technology, Vol. 61 No. 4, p. 639
 Heilprin, L. B. (1988). Annual Review of Information Science and Technology (ARIST): Early historical perspectives. Journal of the American Society for Information Science, 39(4), 273-280.

 

Information science journals
Publications established in 1965
Publications disestablished in 2011
Annual journals
English-language journals
Wiley (publisher) academic journals